Crosthwaite and Lyth is a civil parish in the South Lakeland district of Cumbria, England. In the 2001 census the parish had a population of 562, increasing at the 2011 census to 618.

Governance
The village falls in the Lyth Valley electoral ward. This ward stretches south to Morecambe Bay with a total population of 2,180.

See also

Listed buildings in Crosthwaite and Lyth
Crosthwaite

References

External links

 Crosthwaite and Lyth website
Cumbria County History Trust: Crosthwaite and Lyth (nb: provisional research only – see Talk page)

Civil parishes in Cumbria